St Michael's Catholic Grammar School is a voluntary aided Roman Catholic Grammar School for girls, and boys in the sixth form, situated in Finchley, Barnet, London. Its current headmaster is Michael Stimpson.

History
The school was founded as St Michael's Convent in 1908 by the Sisters of the Poor Child Jesus and is now under their trusteeship. It was the first Roman Catholic school in Finchley since the Reformation. It was a small fee-paying school serving the parish.

Under the Education Act 1944, in 1958, St Michael's became a voluntary aided grammar school to complement the all-boys Finchley Catholic Grammar School (now Finchley Catholic High School). When the Barnet LEA abolished the tripartite system, St Michael's did not turn comprehensive and has remained a grammar school to this day.

Ofsted inspection reports
 St Michael's is a high achieving school where relationships are excellent. The pupils are happy and well cared for morally, socially and spiritually. The school's national reputation in the Catholic community is justifiably high. (Ofsted, 1995)

St Michael's is an exceptional school; which is outstandingly effective because of its excellent leadership, management, teaching and learning (Ofsted, 2005)

St Michael's curriculum
The pupils study Religious Education, English, Mathematics, Latin, French, Spanish, Italian, History, Geography, Science, Music, Art, Physical Education, Drama, Technology, ICT and Education for Living with Citizenship.
Pupils have a choice of either Food/Graphics Technology as well as Physical Education.

St Michael's traditions

School uniform
The school has a distinctive purple uniform, which is the colour of St. Michael's flower, the Michaelmas Daisy. It consists of a pleated purple skirt, a lilac shirt and a purple jumper. In addition there is a purple blazer which must be worn when travelling to and from the school. In the winter there is also a long black coat which pupils have to wear instead of the blazer to and from school.

This royal purple symbolises the status of St. Michael as the archangel who quelled the rebellion of Lucifer.

School motto 
The School motto "Quis ut deus" is a Latin translation of the sarcastic rhetorical question uttered by Archangel Michael as he slew Lucifer: "Who is like God?"  (The name 'Michael' in fact derives from the Hebrew form of this question.)

School song
The school song Dux Michael, which is sung in Latin praising St. Michael the Archangel, protector and defender of the faith. It is always sung on St. Michael's Day and at various key stage certificate assemblies along with the school prayer.

Committees and clubs
In Year 12, a husting takes place to elect the Head Girl/Boy and the two Deputies at St. Michael's. As well as this, several committees and clubs are set up according to the interests of the girls, which vary each year. The pupils are welcome to start their own club or committee along with the help of Year 12 pupils and the permission of the headteacher. Some of the committees and clubs this year include Athletics, Art, Book, Chess, Year 7 Choir, Glee Club, Chamber Choir, Drama, Cultural, Debate, Italian Film, French Film, Justice and Peace, Language, Library, Magazine, Mandarin Chinese, Netball, Badminton, Chamber Orchestra, Junior Orchestra, Jazz Band, Cheerleading, Poetry, Prom, Spanish Film and Year Book.

School events
St Michael's Day is the most important day of the academic year at St Michael's. On this day the whole school, pupils and staff, join in celebration of Mass in the school hall with a liturgy of music and drama. After Mass, free ice cream is given out to its pupils and staff in celebration of St Michael the Archangel.

Mass is not only celebrated on St Michael's Day but liturgies are prepared on the Holy Days of Obligation found in the Catholic Calendar there are also Masses on every Friday lunchtime as well as on the last days of term, part of St Michael's Catholic ethos along with prayers said daily, and Mass weekly.

The staff assembly takes place on the last school assembly before the term breaks for Christmas. It is here that the staff organise an assembly for its pupils, either a talent show or a mini pantomime. Many events are organised throughout the year organised by the staff or various committees. An example includes the Cultural and Charity Committee who organise the traditional "Nigeria, Ireland & Montserrat v. The Rest of the World" netball match played by the staff on St Patrick's Day, with all monies raised going to charity.

St Michael's celebrated their centenary on 28 September 2008, the day before St Michael's Day. The Duke of Gloucester was invited to the school to mark the centenary with the opening of the new sports hall.

Notable former pupils

Natasha Collins, children's TV presenter who died of drug overdose
Karen Harrison, first woman in Britain to be appointed as a train driver, trade unionist and political campaigner
Lisa Jewell, author
Jill Paton Walsh, author
Jessica Martin, actress and comedienne
Lois Joel, footballer for West Ham United

References

External links
St. Michael's Catholic Grammar School website
Finchley Catholic High School website
School Magazine

Grammar schools in the London Borough of Barnet
Girls' schools in London
Educational institutions established in 1908
Catholic secondary schools in the Archdiocese of Westminster
1908 establishments in England
Voluntary aided schools in London
Finchley